Libertad is a Spanish historical drama limited television series set in 19th-century Spain featuring both Western and survival thriller elements, produced by Movistar+ and LaZona, directed by Enrique Urbizu and starring Bebe, Isak Férriz, Xabier Deive, Jorge Suquet, Sofía Oria and Jason Fernández. It was released on 26 March 2021, both the five-part series and a theatrical feature film cut.

Premise 
Set in 1807 Spain, the fiction tracks the struggle of a woman, La Llanera (Bebe), in her search for freedom. After serving a 17-year prison sentence, La Llanera is pardoned and leaves with her son Juan (Jason Fernández), born in prison, son of Lagartijo (Xabier Deive), but they are chased by parties of bandits and hit men on behalf of the Governor (Luis Callejo).

Cast

Production and release 
Produced by LaZona and Movistar+, the series is directed by Enrique Urbizu, whereas the screenplay is authored by Michel Gaztambide and Miguel Barros, who had already worked with Urbizu in Gigantes. The original score was composed by Mario de Benito.
The series mostly features outdoor locations.
Filming ended in March 2020, a week before the country-wide lockdown enforced in Spain because of the COVID-19 pandemic. The series consists of 5 episodes with a running time of around 50 minutes. On 18 February 2021 Enrique Urbizu and Movistar+ presented the series, announcing the slated release date of the full series for 26 March 2021. They also announced an alternative 135-minute-long film format would simultaneously become available in cinemas, distributed by A Contracorriente Films. Beta Film secured the international distribution rights of the series.

References 

Works about travel
Fiction set in 1807
Television series set in the 1800s
Television shows set in Spain
Television shows filmed in Spain
2020s Spanish drama television series
2021 Spanish television series debuts
2021 Spanish television series endings
Movistar+ network series
Spanish-language television shows
2020s Western (genre) television series
Television series about bandits